My Turn is the 24th studio album by American country music artist Tanya Tucker. The album was released June 30, 2009. It is her first studio album since Tanya in 2002. My Turn consists of cover versions of country music standards, including the lead single, "Love's Gonna Live Here", "Lovesick Blues", and "Crazy Arms".

Content 
My Turn consists of 12 cover versions of country music standards that were originally recorded entirely by male artists. Tucker stated that she recorded the album to dedicate to her father, Beau Tucker, stating:

Critical reception 

Allmusic critic Stephen Thomas Erlewine gave the album four and a half out of five stars. Erlewine critiqued Tucker's way of blending each song, stating, "Tucker isn't quite gender-bending the way Lyle Lovett did when he sang "Stand by Your Man," but rather taking these songs directly, sounding as tough as any guy as she saunters her way through "Crazy Arms" and "Lovesick Blues." Erlewine also said that, "Pete Anderson's dry, unadorned production gives this muscle and grit, perhaps the most sympathetic setting Tucker has had in decades, the triumph is all Tanya's, as she digs deep into these songs, finding new meaning within them and proving that a great covers album need not reinterpret the sound of a song in order to reinvent it."

Blake Boldt of Roughstock.com also reviewed the release, and praised the album, stating how Tucker was not just remaking Country music songs like other artists had previously done before, but instead renewing each of them. Boldt also gave positive comments to Tucker's voice, saying, "Now 50, Tucker's vocal stylings remain as provocative as her well-documented wild-child past; her instantly-recognizable drawl is one of country's greatest voices ever, and every knotty note is chock full of hearty twang."

Track listing

Personnel

Musicians
Tanya Tucker - lead vocals
Pete Anderson - bass guitar, acoustic guitar, electric guitar, harmonica, mandola, percussion, string arrangements
Bob "Boo" Bernstein - steel guitar
Tim Godwin - acoustic guitar
Flaco Jiménez - accordion
Jerry Laseter - electric guitar
Jim Lauderdale - duet vocals on "Love's Gonna Live Here"
Mike Murphy - string arrangements, strings
Don Reed - fiddle, strings
Kevin Sepriano - acoustic guitar
Jo-El Sonnier - accordion
Darrin Vincent - backing vocals
Rhonda Vincent - backing vocals
Peter Gayle Williams - drums

Technical
 Pete Anderson – producer
 Sally Brodwer – engineer
 Doug Deveraux – engineer
 Kevin Hare – engineer
 Mike Jason – executive producer
 Keith Krouse – engineer
 Jerry Laseter – producer
 Mike Lattrell – engineer
 Tony Rambo – engineer

Chart performance

References 

2009 albums
Tanya Tucker albums
Albums produced by Pete Anderson
Covers albums